The H3 Launch Vehicle is a Japanese expendable launch system. H3 launch vehicles are liquid-propellant rockets with strap-on solid rocket boosters and are launched from Tanegashima Space Center in Japan. Mitsubishi Heavy Industries (MHI) and JAXA are responsible for the design, manufacture, and operation of the H3. The H3 is the world's first rocket to use an expander bleed cycle for the first stage engine.

, the minimum configuration is to carry a payload of up to  into Sun-synchronous orbit (SSO) for about 5 billion yen, and the maximum configuration is to carry more than  into geostationary transfer orbit (GTO).
geostationary transfer orbit (GTO)(∆Ｖ=1830 m/s).

Development 
Mitsubishi Heavy Industries supervised the development and manufacture of the H3 rocket's airframe and liquid-fuel engines, while IHI Corporation developed and manufactured the liquid-fuel engine turbopumps and solid-fuel boosters, and Kawasaki Heavy Industries developed and manufactured the payload fairings. The carbon fiber and synthetic resin used for the solid fuel booster motor case and payload fairing were developed and manufactured by Toray.

The development of the H3 was authorized by the Japanese government on 17 May 2013. The H3 Launch Vehicle is being jointly developed by JAXA and Mitsubishi Heavy Industries (MHI) to launch a wide variety of commercial satellites. The H3 was designed with cheaper engines compared to the H-IIA, so that manufacturing the new launch vehicle would be faster, less risky, and more cost-effective. JAXA and Mitsubishi Heavy Industries were in charge of preliminary design, the readiness of ground facilities, development of new technologies for the H3, and manufacturing. The main emphasis in design is cost reduction, with planned launch costs for customers in the range of around US$37 million.

In 2015, the first H3 was planned to be launched in fiscal year 2020 in the H3-30 configuration (which lacks solid-rocket boosters), and in a later configuration with boosters in FY2021.

The newly developed LE-9 engine is the most important factor in achieving cost reduction, improved safety and increased thrust. The expander bleed cycle used in the LE-9 engine is a highly reliable combustion method that Japan has put into practical use for the LE-5A/B engine.

Firing tests of the LE-9 first-stage engine began in April 2017, with the first tests of the solid rocket boosters occurring in August 2018.

On 21 January 2022, the launch of the first H3 was rescheduled to FY 2022 or later, citing technical problems regarding the first stage LE-9 engine.

The first launch attempt on 17 February 2023 was aborted just before the SRB-3 boosters ignition, although the main engines were successfully ignited.

On the second launch attempt for the H3 Launch Vehicle on 7 March the vehicle launched at 1:37:55 AM UTC (Universal Time Coordinated). Shortly after the SRB-3 boosters separated from the rocket around two minutes into the flight, the rocket appeared to lose control and begin to tumble based on the views from the ground camera; however, based on subsequent analysis, this appears to be part of a planned dogleg maneuver in order to achieve sun-synchronous orbit and not in fact a loss of control. Approximately five minutes and twenty-seven seconds after launch, the second stage engine failed to ignite. After continuing to be unable to confirm second stage engine ignition, and with the velocity of the rocket continuing to fall, JAXA sent a self-destruct command to the rocket at around L+ 00:14:50 because there was "no possibility of achieving the mission". The payload onboard was the ALOS-3 satellite, which was also destroyed with the launch vehicle on the moment of self-destruct.

Vehicle description 
The H3 Launch Vehicle is a two-stage launch vehicle. The first stage uses liquid oxygen and liquid hydrogen as propellants and carries zero, two or four strap-on solid rocket boosters (SRBs) (derived from SRB-A) using polybutadiene fuel. The first stage is powered by two or three LE-9 engines which uses an expander bleed cycle design similar to the LE-5B engine. The fuel and oxidizer mass of the first stage is 225 metric tons. The second stage is powered by a single engine which is an improved LE-5B. The propellant mass of the second stage is 23 metric tons.

Variants 
Each H3 booster configuration has a two-digit plus letter designation that indicates the features of that configuration. The first digit represents the number of LE-9 engines on the main stage, either "2" or "3". The second digit indicates the number of SRB-3 solid rocket boosters attached to the base of the rocket and can be "0", "2", or "4". All layouts of the solid boosters are symmetrical. The letter at the end shows the length of the payload fairing, either short, or "S", or long, or "L". For example, an H3-24L has two engines, four solid rocket boosters, and a long fairing, whereas an H3-30S has three engines, no solid rocket boosters, and a short fairing. W-type fairing is similar to L-type except wider 5.4 m diameter.

, three configurations are planned: H3-30, H3-22, and H3-24.

A previously mentioned variant, the H3-32, was cancelled in late 2018 when the performance of the H3-22 variant, sporting one less engine on the core booster, was found to be greater than anticipated, putting it close to the H3-32's performance. As commercial clients were apparently willing to be flexible, JAXA proposed redefining their reference transfer orbit to something lower, believing commercial clients would prefer the less expensive (if slightly less capable) H3-22 rocket, even if the client had to then load additional propellant onto their satellite for it to reach GEO, than a more expensive H3-32.

, MHI is considering contributing two variants for the Gateway project: an extended second stage variant, and the H3 Heavy variant which would comprise three first-stage liquid-fuel boosters strapped together, similar to Delta IV Heavy and Falcon Heavy.

Launch services 
H3 will have a "dual-launch capability, but MHI is focused more on dedicated launches" in order to prioritize schedule assurance for customers.

As of 2018, MHI is aiming to price the H3 launch service on par with SpaceX's Falcon 9.

Launch history 

Sources: Japanese Cabinet

The first launch attempt was on 17 February 2023. However, following a nominal countdown and LE-9 ignition, the launch was aborted before liftoff because “an anomaly was found in the first stage system and ignition signals for SRB-3s were not sent.”  JAXA also said that they would need to rollback the rocket to the VAB before attempting a second launch attempt before the end of March.

The second launch attempt was on 7 March 2023. Ignition of center core plus two solid rocket boosters (SRBs) and lift-off appears to have been nominal. However, second stage ignition was not confirmed and a destruct command was subsequently sent, resulting in the payload not reaching orbit and an overall mission failure.

Notes

References

External links 

 JAXA H3 English page
 JAXA H3 pamphlet
 JAXA TODAY No.10

H-III
Expendable space launch systems